The Serbia and Montenegro Women's Basketball Cup, formerly Yugoslav Women's Basketball Cup, was the women's national basketball cup of Serbia and Montenegro (formerly FR Yugoslavia) between 1992 and 2006. It was run by the Basketball Federation of Serbia and Montenegro.

History

Yugoslavia (1992–2003)

Serbia and Montenegro (2003–2006)

Title holders 

 1992–93 Student Niš (Viner Broker Niš)
 1993–94 Crvena zvezda
 1994–95 Crvena zvezda
 1995–96 Vršac (Hemofarm)
 1996–97 Dinamo Pančevo (Profi D Pančevo)
 1997–98 Vršac (Hemofarm)
 1998–99 Vršac (Hemofarm)
 1999–00 Kovin
 2000–01 Vojvodina
 2001–02 Vršac (Hemofarm)
 2002–03 Crvena zvezda
 2003–04 Crvena zvezda
 2004–05 Vršac (Hemofarm)
 2005–06 Vršac (Hemofarm)

Finals

Performance by club

Aftermath 
 Milan Ciga Vasojević Cup
 Montenegrin Women's Basketball Cup

See also 

 First Women's Basketball League of Serbia and Montenegro

References

External links
 Basketball Federation of Serbia
 List of finals in period 1992-2002 at web.archive.org

Women's basketball competitions in Serbia
Women's basketball competitions in Montenegro
Basketball competitions in Serbia and Montenegro
Defunct women's basketball cup competitions in Europe